Theodoros Vasilakakis (born 20 July 1988) is a Greek professional footballer who plays as an attacking midfielder for Super League club Lamia.

Career
Born in Thessaloniki, Vasilakakis began playing professional football with Veria under manager John Mantzourakis. He played for the club from 2007 until 2009, when the team was relegated and he was given a free transfer.

In August 2009, Vasilakakis signed a four-year contract with Xanthi on the recommendation of Giannis Matzourakis.
The club came to an agreement with Veria, which agreed to release the 21-year-old midfielder, who attracted the interest of both Aris and Bochum.

Atromitos
On 3 July 2017, after 7 years with Xanthi, he joined Atromitos  on a two years' contract for an undisclosed fee. He made his debut for the club in a 1–1 home draw against Apollon Smyrni, on 21 August 2017. On 4 December 2017, he scored two astonishing goals, helping his team to a 3–1 away win against Platanias. On 16 December 2017, he scored in a 3–1 away win against Kerkyra. Four days later, his goal gave his team an important 1–0 away win against Asteras Tripoli for the first leg of the round of 16 of the Greek Cup.  On 8 February 2018, he scored in a 3–1 home loss against PAOK for the quarter finals of the Greek Cup, which led to the team's elimination from the semi finals.  On 11 February 2018, he scored in a 2–2 home draw against Olympiacos.  At the end of the 2017–18 season Maccabi Haifa and two other Israeli teams expressed interest in the signature of Vasilakakis, who impressed with his performances, scoring 6 goals and giving 1 assist, but no official offer was ever made to the administration of the club.  

On 29 September 2018, he scored his first goal in the 2018–19 season in a 2–0 away win against Levadiakos.

Later years
On 28 May 2019, he moved to Anorthosis on a two-year deal. On 25 September 2020, he joined Lamia on a free transfer. On On 3 August 2021, he joined Super League Greece 2 club Chania FC on a free transfer. On 1 January 2022, Vasilakakis officially announced from Super League Greece 2 club Kavala F.C. on a free transfer.

Career statistics

Club

Honours
Xanthi
Greek Cup runner-up: 2014–15

References

External links
Επίσημη σελίδα ομάδας Βιογραφικό
onsports.gr Βιογραφικό
onsports.gr Ενδιαφέρον ομάδων

1988 births
Living people
Greek footballers
Greek expatriate footballers
Veria F.C. players
Xanthi F.C. players
Atromitos F.C. players
Anorthosis Famagusta F.C. players
AO Chania F.C. players
PAS Lamia 1964 players
Super League Greece players
Football League (Greece) players
Super League Greece 2 players
Cypriot First Division players
Association football midfielders
Footballers from Thessaloniki
Greek expatriate sportspeople in Cyprus
Expatriate footballers in Cyprus